Patrinia scabiosifolia, the eastern valerian or golden lace, is a species of flowering plant in the family Caprifoliaceae. It is native to southeastern Siberia, Mongolia, the Russian Far East, most of China, Vietnam, Korea, Japan, and the Ryukyu Islands, and it has been introduced to Irkutsk. In Japan it is one of the popular Seven Flowers of Autumn. A spreading perennial, it is readily available in commerce.

Subtaxa
The following forms are accepted:
Patrinia scabiosifolia f. crassa  – central Honshu
Patrinia scabiosifolia f. scabiosifolia – entire range

References

Valerianoideae
Garden plants of Asia
Flora of Chita Oblast
Flora of Amur Oblast
Flora of Khabarovsk Krai
Flora of Primorsky Krai
Flora of Sakhalin
Flora of the Kuril Islands
Flora of Mongolia
Flora of Inner Mongolia
Flora of Manchuria
Flora of North-Central China
Flora of South-Central China
Flora of Southeast China
Flora of Vietnam
Flora of Korea
Flora of Japan
Flora of the Ryukyu Islands
Plants described in 1821